The Lakshmana Temple is a 10th-century Hindu temple built by Yashovarman located in Khajuraho, India. It is dedicated to Vaikuntha Vishnu - an aspect of Vishnu.

Location

This temple is located in the Western Temple complex in Khajuraho. Khajuraho is a small village in the Chhatarpur District of Madhya Pradesh, India.

Architecture

It is a Sandhara Temple of the Panchayatana Variety. The entire temple complex stands on a high platform (Jagati), as seen in image. The structure consists of all the elements of Hindu temple architecture. It has entrance porch (ardh-mandapa), Mandapa, Maha-Mandapa, Antarala and Garbhagriha.

Unlike other temples in Khajuraho, its sanctum is Pancharatha on plan (top-view). Its shikhara is clustered with minor urushringas (refer images of temple top i.e. shikhara).

The wall portion is studded with balconied windows with ornate balustrades. It has two rows of sculptures (refer images of temple's outer wall) including divine figures, couples and erotic scenes. The sanctum doorway is of seven sakhas (vertical panels). The central one being decorated with the ten incarnation of Vishnu. The Lintel depicts goddess Lakshmi in the centre flanked by Brahma and Vishnu. The sanctum contains four-armed sculpture of Vishnu. One of the niches has the image of the sculptor and his disciples at work.

Sculptures

Main idol

Main image is of three-headed & four-armed sculpture of Vaikuntha Vishnu.

The central head is of human, and two sides of boar (depicting Varaha) and lion (depicting Narashima).

Outer wall sculpture

Sculptures inside temple

References

External links

 M.P. Tourism Website, Official Website of Madhya Pradesh State Tourism Corporation, Khajuraho
 Archaeological Survey of India, Bhopal Division, Index Page for Khajuraho - Chhatarpur
 Archaeological Survey of India, Bhopal Division, Lakshmana Temple, Khajuraho

Monuments and memorials in Madhya Pradesh
World Heritage Sites in Madhya Pradesh
Hindu temples in Khajuraho